The 1984 Ballon d'Or, given to the best football player in Europe as judged by a panel of sports journalists from UEFA member countries, was awarded to Michel Platini on 25 December 1984.

Rankings

References

External links
 France Football Official Ballon d'Or page

 
1984
1984–85 in European football